The 2019–20 season was K.A.A. Gent's 117th season in existence and the club's 31st consecutive season in the top flight of Belgium football. It covered a period from 1 July 2019 to 30 June 2020. Gent competed in the Belgian First Division A, the Belgian Cup and the UEFA Europa League.

Players

Current squad

Out on loan
For recent transfers, see List of Belgian football transfers summer 2018.

Pre-season and friendlies

Competitions

Overview

Belgian First Division A

League table

Results summary

Results by round

Matches
On 2 April 2020, the Jupiler Pro League's board of directors proposed to cancel the season due to the COVID-19 pandemic. The General Assembly accepted the proposal on 15 May, and officially ended the 2019–20 season.

Belgian Cup

UEFA Europa League

Second qualifying round

Third qualifying round

Play-off round

Group stage

Knockout phase

Round of 32

Statistics

Squad appearances and goals
Last updated on 7 March 2020.

|-
! colspan=12 style=background:#dcdcdc; text-align:center|Goalkeepers

|-
! colspan=12 style=background:#dcdcdc; text-align:center|Defenders

|-
! colspan=12 style=background:#dcdcdc; text-align:center|Midfielders

|-
! colspan=12 style=background:#dcdcdc; text-align:center|Forwards

|-
! colspan=12 style=background:#dcdcdc; text-align:center|Players who have made an appearance this season but have left the club

|}

References

External links

K.A.A. Gent seasons
K.A.A. Gent
2019–20 UEFA Europa League participants seasons